R/C Stunt Copter is a video game developed by Shiny Entertainment with Big Grub for PlayStation in 1999.

Development
R/C Stunt Copter was originally announced under the title "Fly by Wire". David Perry decided to create the game because flying a radio-controlled helicopter is something most males would like to do but could not afford to.

Mathematician Robert Suh modeled the radio-controlled helicopter and its flight mechanics, using a book of equations for flight models as a reference. The game was designed specifically for the PlayStation's Dual Analog Controller.

Reception

The game received favorable reviews according to the review aggregation website GameRankings. Chris Charla of NextGen said of the game, "A unique game with unique control, this game is a winner." In Japan, where the game was ported and published by Taito on November 30, 2000, Famitsu gave it a score of 26 out of 40.

Four-Eyed Dragon of GamePro said, "If you're an RC hobbyist or a flight-sim fan, R/C Stunt Copter is great to play; otherwise, rent the game for a quick test flight."

Notes

References

External links
 

1999 video games
General flight simulators
Helicopter video games
Interplay Entertainment games
PlayStation (console) games
PlayStation (console)-only games
Taito games
Titus Software games
Video games about toys
Video games developed in the United States